Salman Ahmed Rashed Shareeda (born 19 May 1968) is a Bahraini football coach and former player who is the head coach of Bahraini club Hidd.

Club career 
Shareeda began his youth career at Al-Muharraq's youth sector in the late-1960s, coached by his older brother Rashid. He made his first-team debut in the 1972–73 Bahraini Premier League, becoming a key player for the club by helping them win numerous domestic titles. Sharida retired as a player in 1981, due to injury problems.

International career 
Shareeda played for the Bahrain under-20s at the 1973 AFC Youth Championship in Iran. He played for the senior team at the 1974 Asian Games, also in Iran, and at the 3rd Arabian Gulf Cup in 1974, in Kuwait. Due to an injury, he was unable to participate in the 4th Arabian Gulf Cup in Qatar two years later. 

Shareeda played the opening game of the 5th Arabian Gulf Cup, held in 1979, against hosts Iraq; this was ultimately his last international game, as he withdrew injured.

Managerial career 
Sharida began coaching in the late-1980s, as head coach of Al-Muharraq's youth sector. He then coached the Bahrain under-20s at the 1987 FIFA World Youth Championship in Chile.

Having already coached the Bahrain national team, Sharida was appointed head coach of the Pakistan national team on a one-year contract in October 2005. He became Pakistan's first head coach from the Gulf region, and the first Bahraini to coach outside of Bahrain. Sharida coached Pakistan at the 2005 SAFF Championship.

In 2011, Shareeda was coach of the Bahrain Olympic team; he was dismissed in December.

Between 2013 and 2014, Sharida took charge of Al-Muharraq. He coached Hidd between 2015 and 2016. In October 2016, Sharida was appointed head coach of Riffa. He coached Al-Muharraq in 2018, and Hidd since 2021.

References

External links
 
 
 
 

1968 births
Living people
People from Muharraq
Bahraini footballers
Association football midfielders
Al-Muharraq SC players
Bahraini Premier League players
Bahrain youth international footballers
Bahrain international footballers
Footballers at the 1974 Asian Games
Bahraini football managers
Bahrain national football team managers
Pakistan national football team managers
Al-Muharraq SC managers
Al-Arabi SC (UAE) managers
Hidd SCC managers
Riffa SC managers
Bahraini Premier League managers
AFC Cup winning managers
2011 AFC Asian Cup managers
Bahraini expatriate football managers
Bahraini expatriate sportspeople in Pakistan
Bahraini expatriate sportspeople in the United Arab Emirates
Expatriate football managers in Pakistan
Expatriate football managers in the United Arab Emirates